The Royal Corps of Naval Constructors (RCNC) is an institution of the British Royal Navy and Admiralty for training in naval architecture, marine, electrical and weapon engineering.  It was established by Order in Council in August 1883, on the recommendation of the naval architect Sir William White. Its precursor was the Royal School of Naval Architecture, London.

According to the Royal Navy's Books of Reference 3 Chapter 46, it is a "civilian corps and an integrated part of the Defence Engineering & Science Group". Members in certain posts who do not hold commissions are eligible to wear a uniform similar to that of the Royal Navy and are accorded the same respect as commissioned officers.

History
From Tudor times, the ships of the Royal Navy were built in the Royal Dockyards under the supervision of the Master Shipwright and to the design of the Surveyor of the Navy who was always an ex-Master Shipwright. In 1805, seeing the growing application of science in industry, Lord Barham’s Commission recommended, that a School of Naval Architecture should be formed to produce men suitably trained both to design the ships of the fleet and to manage the work of the Royal Dockyards. This school was created in 1811 at Portsmouth and after an erratic series of changes it settled down at Greenwich in 1873.

The graduates of these schools were Naval Architects who quickly established high professional standards in the field. Their influence, combined with the effects of the Industrial Revolution led to the formation of the Institution (now the Royal Institution) of Naval Architects in 1860.

Although the number of professionally qualified Naval Architects employed in the design, building and repair of warships had risen to 27 by 1875, ships were still being designed and built against the Chief Constructor’s advice and there were inevitable disasters.  The main obstacle to progress was the poor career prospects of the professionally qualified Naval Architect with the linked difficulty of getting sufficient recruits.

To solve these linked problems William White, then Professional Assistant to the Director of Naval Construction, proposed a co-ordinated training programme and career structure and these ideas were approved in 1882 by a committee under Lord Brassey: On 23 August 1883, Queen Victoria approved an order in Council as follows:

WHEREAS, we have had under our consideration the position of the Civilian Officers charged with Shipbuilding duties in the Department of the Controller of the Navy, and in Your Majesty’s Dockyards; and whereas we are humbly of the opinion that the said officers should be constituted into a Corps, to be called “The Royal Corps of Naval Constructors”, Your Majesty having been graciously pleased to approve of the said Corps being designated Royal.

We recommend that Your Majesty will, by your order in Council, approve of the Corps being constituted under such Rules and Regulations as regards Titles, Numbers and Salaries as we may from time to time determine with the concurrence of the Lords Commissioners of Your Majesty’s Treasury.

The first head of the Royal Corps of Naval Constructors was Sir Nathaniel Barnaby. Due to illness his resignation in 1885 led to the appointment of Sir William White as his successor.

The professional Naval Architects of the Royal Corps had grown in number to 91 by 1901 and were heavily involved in the build up to the First World War.

The Royal Corps had a flirtation with airship design between 1915 and 1922 but this was overshadowed by the conversion of ships to operate aircraft and the design and construction of the first purpose built ship to carry aircraft, .  The success of these ships, together with that of submarines and escorts designed by the Royal Corps, played a large part in establishing British naval supremacy.

The Second World War saw a similar expansion of the shipbuilding effort and the evacuation to Bath of the Director of Naval Construction.  Many members of the Royal Corps served in uniform in the ranks up to the level of Constructor Rear-Admiral.

In the post-war period the major features have been the very considerable achievement in designing and maintaining a fleet of nuclear-powered submarines and the changing nature of the Royal Corps itself.

Recognising the increasing impact of a vessel’s equipment on its hull and structure, the Royal Corps combined with the professional Electrical and Mechanical Engineers of the Royal Naval Engineering Service (RNES) in 1977.  Whereas the RCNC wore a grey stripe between the gold stripes when in uniform, the RNES had a dark green stripe. After amalgamation, all officers of the now larger RCNC adopted the grey stripe. Further amalgamation with specialist weapons designers was also enacted. In the last decade this more diverse corps has been instrumental in the design and manufacture of the very latest iconic warships such as the Type 45 class air warfare destroyer, s and s; all of which contain highly complex and powerful engineering systems.

The Royal Corps currently numbers nearly 100 naval architects, marine, electrical and weapon engineers and, in keeping with its original aims, continues to provide highly professional engineers for the design, building and maintenance of vessels of the Royal Navy. Indeed, the skills of the naval constructor have been keenly sought by UK warship building and the global marine industry giving the Corps a unique and effective professional network.

Six naval constructors gave their lives in the course of duty; Arthur K Stephens, Assistant Constructor 2c, who was lost 31 May 1916 aboard HMS Queen Mary which was sunk at the Battle of Jutland (listed as ‘Admiralty Civilian’). F. Bailey and A.A.F. Hill were lost in the  disaster of June 1939. H.H.Palmer was lost at sea on the SS Aguila whilst on route to Gibraltar for Dockyard duties in August 1941, Also during World War Two F. Bryant was killed in the bombing of Bath in 1942 and R. King was killed in Mombasa.

The RCNC and the Naval Service

The RCNC, by virtue of the Order in Council, forms part of the Royal Naval Service. As such members of the Corps hold equivalent Royal Navy ranks, preceded by the word "Constructor", and followed by the post nominal designation RCNC (example Constructor Commander A. Nonsuch, RCNC). Constructors are entitled to wear a modified version of the standard RN uniform, the difference being the presence of grey bands between gold stripes worn on the arms and on shoulder boards. Constructors may wear uniform in certain posts in UK establishments (predominantly naval bases) and in several overseas posts.

RCNC Uniform Ranks

References

External links
A set of annual albums produced by the Corps

1883 establishments in the United Kingdom
Marine engineering organizations
History of the Royal Navy
Admiralty during World War II
Royal Navy